Carmen Sarmiento (born 30 August 1944) is a Spanish journalist and television presenter specializing in international and social issues especially relating to feminism and disadvantaged women. She was a pioneering woman in war journalism.

Biography
Carmen Sarmiento was born in Madrid on August 30, 1944. She started in Televisión Española in 1968 reporting in the International Information Services. Her early work was in programs such as Weekly Report, First page and Objective from 1979 to 1981. Sarmiento covered coups in Portugal, Argentina, Granada and Ghana. She was also a war correspondent in El Salvador, Nicaragua and Lebanon. Sarmiento interviewed Yasser Arafat, Fidel Castro and Rigoberta Menchú. She has won awards in recognition of her work.

In 1984 she premiered a series of reports on Outcasts on Televisión Española (TVE) which continued to 1991. In 1994, she focused on problems women experienced in Africa and Latin America and in 2000 she created Los excluidos working with the NGO Manos Unidas.

Bibliography

 La mujer, una revolución en marcha, Madrid: Sedmay, 1976. , OCLC 892239734
 Sánchez Albornoz, cuarenta años después Madrid : Editorial Sedmay : Distribuidora Maydi, 1976. , OCLC 2374490
 Los marginados Ed. Ser. de Publ. del Ente Público RTV, 1985. OCLC 912643388
 Viajes a la marginación, Madrid Mondadori, 1990. , OCLC 254249214
 Cuaderno de viaje de Los Excluidos,
 Los excluidos. Cuadernos de viaje de Carmen Sarmiento, Barcelona : Oásis, 2000. , OCLC 44626115

References and sources

IMDB

1944 births
Living people
People from Madrid
Spanish women journalists
Spanish television journalists